Badli is a village, nearby Jhajjar city in Jhajjar district, Haryana, India.

Notable persons 
Kuldeep Vats is member of the Haryana Legislative Assembly from the Indian National Congress representing the Badli, Jhajjar Vidhan sabha Constituency in Haryana .

Naresh sharma former member of the Haryana Legislative Assembly from the  Indian National Congress representing the Badli, Jhajjar Vidhan sabha Constituency in Haryana . He is 2 times MLA from Congress party. Now he is in INLD party .

See also 
 Sarola
 Subana
 Khudan
 Chhapar, Jhajjar
 Dhakla, Jhajjar
 Machhrauli

References 

Villages in Jhajjar district